Kilmorack is a small hamlet in Inverness-shire, in the Highlands of Scotland and now in the Highland Council area. The river is part of the Affric-Beauly hydro-electric power scheme, with a dam and power station at Kilmorack. The old parish church (1786) was adapted in 1997 to show contemporary Scottish art in Kilmorack Gallery.

Notable People

Rev William Fraser (1851-1919) Moderator of the General Assembly of the Free Church of Scotland in 1912 born and raised in Kilmorack.

References

Populated places in Inverness committee area